On 26 January 2015, an F-16D Fighting Falcon jet fighter of the Hellenic Air Force crashed into the flight line at Los Llanos Air Base in Albacete, Spain, killing 11 people: the two crew members and nine on the ground. Twenty-one others, all on the ground, were injured.

Background
Los Llanos Air Base is the venue of NATO's Tactical Leadership Program (TLP), a regular series of training exercises for personnel from ten NATO member air forces. In January 2015, during TLP2015-1, several NATO air forces deployed aircraft to the base, including four F-16 Block 50 fighter aircraft of the Hellenic Air Force's 341st Squadron, supported by 41 pilots and technicians from the 111th Combat Wing, based at Nea Anchialos Air Base.

Accident
On 26 January 2015, one of the Greek F-16s crashed into other aircraft at the base just after takeoff, causing an explosion which killed 9 people. A total of five aircraft on the ground were damaged or destroyed, including two Italian AMXs, two French Alpha Jets, and one French Mirage 2000.

Those killed included the two Greek crew members of the F-16 and eight French personnel on the ground. 21 individuals were injured, six of them severely. The following day, a French airman who was severely burned in the accident died, bringing the death toll to eleven.

In addition to the loss of personnel, the crash resulted in the write-off of two Dassault Mirage 2000D fighters and two Alpha Jet trainers of the French Air Force. Two of its Dassault Rafales were also severely damaged.

Investigation
Initial findings were that a technical fault developed on board the F-16 during take-off, and the two crew members had tried to eject.

References

Los Llanos
Accidents and incidents involving French Air and Space Force aircraft 
Accidents and incidents involving military aircraft
Aviation accidents and incidents in Spain
2015 in Castilla–La Mancha
Hellenic Air Force
January 2015 events in Spain
History of the province of Albacete